Hoseynabad-e Amjadi (also Romanized as Ḩoseynābād-e Amjadī) is a village in Gavrud Rural District, in the Central District of Sonqor County, Kermanshah Province, Iran. At the 2006 census, its population was 333, in 73 families.

References 

Populated places in Sonqor County